Cross (also known as Smile For Me) is a 2012 Hong Kong horror thriller film written and directed by Daniel Chan, Steve Woo, Lau Kin-ping, Hui Shu-ing and starring Simon Yam, Kenny Wong, Liu Kai-chi and Nick Cheung. The film revolves around a Catholic serial killer played by Yam, who after witnessing his wife's death, believes he is given the duty to kill suicidal people to bring them peace and thereby allow them to enter heaven.

Plot
One day, a man brings luggage to a police report room. From the luggage, he takes out some files, a plastic wrapped scalpel and a half-filled vial, one by one, and methodically places them in front of the police while confessing that he killed a man and wants to surrender. He has actually been involved in many murder cases during the past few months.

The man's name is Lee Leung, who claims he is not a serial killer but an angel of God. This is God's test for him, first to have his wife commit suicide to end the pain of leukemia, and then to have him suffer from the pain of losing his wife; if suffering people want to end their lives themselves, they would have to suffer in hell; life and death is a tragedy, and there is no way out.

Lee Leung begins to pay attention to online news stories about suicides and incidentally finds a discussion site about suicide, where people share various methods of committing it, and some would also talk about their reasons for committing it, including some for their family, and others because they have lost the meaning of life. He understands the suffering of people wanting to commit suicide, and believes his mission is to help those people escape from pain. He asked God to give him strength to redeem these suffering people: since they choose to die, he will perform the duty of murder, so the victim can be murdered instead of committing suicide and that they may enter heaven after they die. He meets four suicidal people online and communicates to them one by one and fulfils their wishes. When Lee Leung opines that he is executing for God's will, he finds that his faith and plan of salvation suffers from an impact he is unable to withstand.

Cast
Simon Yam as Lee Leung
Kenny Wong as Professor Cheung
Liu Kai-chi as Mr. Yip
Mimi Kung as Mrs. Yip / Chan Wai-fong
Evelyn Choi as Mabel Wong
Chen Ran as Ai
Nick Cheung as Mr. Wong
Pal Sinn as Convicted killer
Océane Zhu as Lee Leung's wife
Kageyama Yukihiko as Louis
Au Hin-wai as Sergeant Wong
Jason Cheung as Yip Wing-hong/ Jason Chan
Mo Tzu-yi

References

External links
Official website

Cross at Hong Kong Cinemagic

2012 films
2012 horror films
2012 horror thriller films
Hong Kong horror thriller films
2010s serial killer films
Hong Kong serial killer films
2010s Cantonese-language films
Films set in Hong Kong
Films shot in Hong Kong
Hong Kong slasher films
Religious horror films
2010s slasher films
2012 directorial debut films
2010s Hong Kong films